Ṣilmia is the fifth month of the Mandaean calendar.

Silmia, which literally means 'sculptures', is the Mandaic name for the constellation Gemini. It currently corresponds to Nov / Dec in the Gregorian calendar due to a lack of a leap year in the Mandaean calendar.

References

Months of the Mandaean calendar
Gemini in astrology